Eryin Alexis Sanhueza Mora (born 29 April 1996) is a Chilean footballer who plays for Deportes Melipilla as a goalkeeper.

International career
Along with Chile U20, he won the L'Alcúdia Tournament in 2015.

Personal life
He is the younger brother of the also footballer Miguel Sanhueza.

Honours
Chile U20
 L'Alcúdia International Tournament (1): 2015

References

External links
 

1996 births
Living people
Footballers from Santiago
Chilean footballers
Chile youth international footballers
Chile under-20 international footballers
Chilean Primera División players
Segunda División Profesional de Chile players
Primera B de Chile players
Audax Italiano footballers
Deportes Colchagua footballers
Lautaro de Buin footballers
Deportes Melipilla footballers
Association football goalkeepers